Simone Rapp (born 1 October 1992) is a Swiss professional footballer who plays for German club Karlsruher SC in the 2. Bundesliga.

Career
Rapp was loaned out from Thun to St. Gallen on 7 January 2019 for the rest of the season.

On 7 June 2021, he signed a two-year contract with Vaduz.

Career statistics

References

External links
Profile at St. Gallen

Living people
1992 births
People from Locarno District
Sportspeople from Ticino
Swiss men's footballers
Association football forwards
Switzerland under-21 international footballers
Switzerland youth international footballers
FC Locarno players
FC Wohlen players
FC Thun players
FC Lausanne-Sport players
FC St. Gallen players
Sepsi OSK Sfântu Gheorghe players
FC Vaduz players
Karlsruher SC players
Swiss Super League players
Swiss Challenge League players
Liga I players
Swiss expatriate footballers
Swiss expatriate sportspeople in Romania
Expatriate footballers in Romania
Swiss expatriate sportspeople in Liechtenstein
Expatriate footballers in Liechtenstein
Swiss expatriate sportspeople in Germany
Expatriate footballers in Germany